Clemens of Saxony (Clemens Maria Joseph Nepomuk Aloys Vincenz Xaver Franz de Paula Franz de Valois Joachim Benno Philipp Jakob; 1 May 1798 – 4 January 1822) was a Prince of Saxony. He was the second son of Prince Maximilian of Saxony (1759–1838) and his first wife, Princess Carolina of Parma (1770–1804), daughter of Ferdinand, Duke of Parma. He was a member of the house of Wettin.

Biography
Clemens was born in Dresden, one of the seven children of Maximilian of Saxony by his first wife Princess Carolina of Parma. His father was a son of Frederick Christian, Elector of Saxony, while his mother was a daughter of Ferdinand, Duke of Parma. Through his mother, Clemens was also a direct descendant of Louis XIV of France and Empress Maria Theresa. He was raised alongside his two brothers, the future kings Frederick Augustus II and Johann I. Clemens was a young boy during the time of the Napoleonic wars and had to flee from his home several times; he and his family were forced to sleep on straw wherever they could find shelter.

In 1815, Clemens visited the Austrian headquarters accompanied by his older brother. Archduke Ferdinand of Austria-Este gave them the warmest welcome. After visiting Paris and the capitals of southern Germany, Clemens and Frederick Augustus returned to Dresden in October, where they continued their studies with their younger brother Johann. During a trip to Italy with his brothers, Clemens contracted a fever and died in Pisa on January 4, 1822.

Ancestry

References

1798 births
1822 deaths
House of Wettin
Nobility from Dresden
Saxon princes
Burials at San Lorenzo, Florence